Ali Morad Khani or Alimoradkhani or Ali Moradkhani or Ali Morad Khan may refer to:
 Alimorad Khan
 Ali Morad Khani-ye Olya
 Ali Morad Khani-ye Sofla